The millennium celebrations were a worldwide, coordinated series of events to celebrate and commemorate the end of 1999 and the start of the year 2000 in the Gregorian calendar. The celebrations were held as marking the end of the 2nd millennium and the 20th century, and the start of the 3rd millennium and the 21st century (although the start and end points of such periods was then, and continues to be, disputed). Countries around the globe held official festivities in the weeks and months leading up to the date, such as those organised in the United States by the White House Millennium Council, and most major cities produced firework displays at midnight. Equally, many private venues, cultural and religious centres held events and a diverse range of memorabilia was created, including souvenir postage stamps.

As with every New Year's Eve, many events were timed with the stroke of midnight in the time zone of the location. There were also many events associated with the dawn on 1 January. An international television broadcast called 2000 Today was produced by a consortium of 60 broadcasters, while an alternative program Millennium Live was cancelled two days before the event.

Several countries in the middle of the Pacific Ocean, and hence close to the International Date Line made arguments they were the first to enter the new millennium. Variously, the Chatham Islands, New Zealand, Tonga, Fiji and Kiribati all laid claims to the status – by moving the dateline itself, the temporary institution of daylight saving time, and claiming the "first territory", "first land", "first inhabited land" or "first city" to see the new year.

Events

UTC+14
The US Navy submarine Topeka positioned itself  underwater, straddling both the International Date Line and the Equator.

At Caroline Island in the mid-Pacific, renamed as "Millennium Island", the Republic of Kiribati claimed the first land to see the new millennium. Simultaneously, a ceremony was held in Tonga, consisting of a choir recitation of Hallelujah, and an address by King Tāufaʻāhau Tupou IV.

On the Chatham Islands (UTC+13:45) there was a Māori blessing. "As they faced the Pacific Ocean, a beacon was lit and school children sang."

UTC+13
In Auckland, a fireworks display on the Harbour made New Zealand the first industrial nation to celebrate the year 2000, being just west of the International Date Line.

UTC+12

UTC+11
Sydney, the host city of the 2000 Summer Olympics, held a large fireworks display centering on the Harbour Bridge, with the locally famous graffito Eternity being recreated. For the first time in its history, the Sydney Opera House precinct was almost completely cordoned off from the public. Instead, tickets costing as much as  each were being sold for Opera House parties. However, public transport and access was available to view the fireworks on the Bridge, which included a "waterfall" effect.

UTC+10
Adelaide's celebrations were at their Central Business District with a special presentation before the countdown and many fireworks. Adelaide was on UTC+10:30 during daylight saving time.

Brisbane's celebrations were broadcast live on ABC (Australia) and worldwide via 2000 Today.

UTC+9
In Tokyo, there were a series of concerts (NHK's Kōhaku Uta Gassen at NHK Hall, Johnny's Countdown Live at the Tokyo Dome) and a fireworks display. At midnight, temple bells across Japan were rung 108 times to "dispel the evils of mankind".

The Japanese heavy metal band Seikima-II played its last concert "The Doomsday" before its first breakup on 31 December. A major part of the band's fictional storyline was a prophecy stating that they would conquer the world before breaking up in 1999, with the name of the band itself being a pun meaning "the end of the century" in Japanese. Following the conclusion of the concert at 23:59:59 on 31 December (a second before midnight), the band disbanded and could be seen disappearing into a portal of light leaving the stage.

UTC+8
The traditional Chinese New Year did not start until 5 February of that year, however celebrations were still held in Beijing alongside fireworks and dragon dances. At midnight, Chinese paramount leader Jiang Zemin lit a flame dedicated to the history of Chinese civilization.

In Hong Kong, at eight minutes to midnight, film star Jackie Chan led a group of singers, and at the stroke of midnight, a fireworks display began.

In the Philippines, millennium parties simultaneously began in different parts of the country. President Joseph Estrada and top government officials joined celebrations at the Rizal Park (which was broadcast on ABS-CBN), while at the Ayala Millennium Center, Regine Velasquez sang the Philippine Millennium Theme Song, "Written in the Sand" at the top of the Peninsula Manila at about ten minutes to the Philippine midnight as part of the Philippine presentation on 2000 Today (Global Millennium Day broadcast on GMA).

In Singapore, a pop trio consisting of Fann Wong, Tanya Chua and Elsa Lin performed a millennium song for Singapore, entitled Moments of Magic.

UTC+7
Fireworks for the Vietnamese New Year in February were cancelled; in turn, Ho Chi Minh City organized a countdown party on 31 December at 10 pm, culminating in fireworks which began at midnight.

UTC+6
In India (UTC+5:30), many Indians use the Hindu calendar, but the start of the year 2000 was still celebrated. On New Year's Eve, fireworks were observed in the capital New Delhi. This was overshadowed by the return of Indian Airlines Flight 814's passengers and crew, who arrived home from Afghanistan after being held hostage for a week.

One way the new millennium was celebrated in India was with the grand opening of the Thiruvalluvar Statue a 41 m (133 ft) stone statue in Kanyakumari, Tamil Nadu, depicting Valluvar, a Tamil speaking poet, philosopher and author of the Tirukkural, a book on morality. Both Valluvar and the Tirukkural are treated with reverence by Tamil speakers regardless of political or religious background with the Tirukkural considered the most important work written in Tamil.

UTC+5

UTC+4

UTC+3

Moscow's government and the Russian national government had sponsored parties across the city. Celebrations were held at the Spasskaya Tower to ring in the new millennium.

The President of Russia Boris Yeltsin unexpectedly announced his resignation during his annual Presidential New Year Address. For the rest of the day and into 2000, Prime Minister Vladimir Putin served as Acting President, and he gave a New Year address of his own on the same day. In March 2000, Putin was elected as president in his own right.

UTC+2
South Africa's Nelson Mandela lit a candle in his former cell at Robben Island at the stroke of midnight.

Athens held a fireworks display over the Acropolis and a televised choir sang the Olympic anthem, a Byzantine anthem and the Greek national anthem.

In Giza, a concert entitled The Twelve Dreams of the Sun with music by Jean-Michel Jarre was held on the Pyramids. At the time, most Egyptians were observing the Muslim holy month of Ramadan.

In Jerusalem, and particularly at the Mount of Olives, fears that doomsday fanatics "...could try to trigger an apocalypse prompted one of Israel's biggest peacetime police operations."

UTC+1
Paris was the focal point of celebrations in France where searchlights and 20,000 strobe lights for the event were installed on the Eiffel Tower. They remained in operation until June 2003, when they were replaced by another installation.

In Madrid, star-shaped balloons were set up at midnight on top of the Casa de Correos building in Puerta del Sol Square.

In Stockholm, the band Europe performed a concert to celebrate the new millennium. This was the first concert played by the band since 1992 when they went on hiatus, and they were brought back together due to a request to perform such a concert. For the first and (so far only) time, both of their lead guitarists, John Norum and Kee Marcello played together, as both of them had accepted the offer of playing with the band that night. The two songs performed, "Rock the Night" and "The Final Countdown", the band's two biggest hits, had extra meaning due to the night they were sung on.

In Vatican City, Pope John Paul II led a blessing in St Peter's Square.

UTC±0
In London, attention focused around Big Ben, as well as the opening of the Millennium Dome. A huge fireworks display, called the "River of Fire", went along 4 miles (6 km) of the River Thames.

The Irish national radio and television organisation RTÉ produced a marathon 19-hour broadcast called Millennium Eve: Celebrate 2000, while the BBC in the United Kingdom headed an international 28-hour event known as 2000 Today.

UTC–1

UTC–2
Rio de Janeiro held a special party led by Gal Costa at minutes to midnight. South Georgia and the Sandwich Islands became the first place in the Americas to celebrate the millennium but with no people on it, all of the British inhabitants chose to spend the midnight celebrations back at GMT time.

UTC–3
Argentina's celebration was centered in Ushuaia, the southernmost city in the world, with a tango performance by Julio Bocca and Eleonora Cassano, broadcast on ARTEAR (El Trece)'s El Día del Milenio and worldwide through the BBC-led 2000 Today.

UTC–4
In Newfoundland (UTC-4:30), a concert was held that was broadcast to thousands of Canadians as the small island celebrated being the first place in North America to welcome the 21st century. Meanwhile, in Bermuda, celebrations were marked as the first Caribbean nation to crossover to the new millennium reached its highest at midnight.

UTC–5

In Ottawa, Canadian Prime Minister Jean Chrétien presided over celebrations on Parliament Hill, which included artistic performances and a midnight fireworks display launched from the Peace Tower.

Fireworks were launched from the CN Tower in Toronto.

In Montreal, thousands attended a Celine Dion millennium concert at the Molson Centre, which concluded her Let's Talk About Love World Tour.

In New York City's Times Square, a new Times Square Ball made of Waterford Crystal was commissioned and organizers expected a total attendance exceeding two million spectators. It was broadcast live during ABC 2000 Today with Peter Jennings and Dick Clark in the United States, and worldwide via 2000 Today. Meanwhile, elsewhere in the city, in Madison Square Garden, Billy Joel was performing a special concert to celebrate the new millennium. Leading up to the first few moments of 2000, Joel sang a special song titled "2000 Years". After that, there was a brief countdown to the year 2000 and at the stroke of midnight, Joel sang "Auld Lang Syne", a song traditionally sung in the western world at the stroke of midnight in the first few seconds of the new year. The concert was released on an album titled "2000 Years: The Millennium Concert" in May 2000.

A millennium celebration was held at the Walt Disney World in Florida, primarily at the Epcot theme park.

U.S. President Bill Clinton watched with thousands of spectators in Washington, D.C. as the Washington Monument lit up at midnight. Washington was also the world's largest Y2K command center despite GMT being the coordinated time zone.

In the Roxy Theatre in Atlanta, Georgia, the band Gov't Mule played three sets for a concert at the theatre to celebrate the millennium. At the first set, during the last few minutes before 2000, the band played their song "Towering Fool" which was then followed by a brief "Countdown Jam" for the remainder of the old year. Immediately after the millennium started, the band sang a cover of King Crimson's song "21st Century Schizoid Man" (the first time the band sang the song at a concert) to welcome the 21st century. The concert was released as an album though not until 2010.

UTC–6
Chicago celebrated the millennium by hosting a fireworks show on Navy Pier, along with celebrations at homes and in Grant Park, as was viewed during the ABC 2000 Today broadcast.

UTC–7
Singer Neil Diamond sang "America" during a concert given by him at the Pepsi Center in Denver, Colorado and incorporated the Mountain Time millennium countdown and celebrations into the performance.

UTC–8
In Los Angeles, the Hollywood Sign became illuminated in various colors, one of the very few times the sign became lit. It was also the last stop in the ABC 2000 Today broadcast in the United States.

UTC–9

UTC–10
Hawaiian celebrations were centered in Honolulu. The party was headed by then-governor Benjamin Cayetano and his family.

UTC–11
Samoa, the last independent nation to celebrate the new millennium, remains unchallenged in its claim as the last place on Earth to celebrate the closing of the century. This time zone remained in use in Samoa until 29 December 2011, when it would be shifted to UTC+13.

See also
 Year 2000 problem
 List of UTC time offsets
 2000 millennium attack plots

Notes

References

New Year celebrations
Celebrations
January 2000 events
December 1999 events